Malawi participated in the 2010 Summer Youth Olympics in Singapore.

The Malawi team consisted of 3 athletes in 3 sports: athletics, swimming and table tennis. It was the first Olympic competition in which the Malawian team competed under their new flag.

Athletics

Note: The athletes who do not have a "Q" next to their Qualification Rank advance to a non-medal ranking final.

Boys
Track and road events

Swimming

Table tennis

Men's
Qualification

Group C

Men's
Non-medal groups

Group HH

Mixed teams

Non medal tournament

References

External links
Competitors List: Malawi

2010 in Malawian sport
Nations at the 2010 Summer Youth Olympics
Malawi at the Youth Olympics